Gerrit van Wees (26 January 1913 – 5 May 1995) was a Dutch cyclist. He competed in the team pursuit event at the 1936 Summer Olympics.

See also
 List of Dutch Olympic cyclists

References

External links
 

1913 births
1995 deaths
Dutch male cyclists
Olympic cyclists of the Netherlands
Cyclists at the 1936 Summer Olympics
People from Heemstede
Cyclists from North Holland